Kenyon is a surname of English origin. The name first appears in English heraldry, the first known holder being Jordan Kenyon, Lord of Winwick, Cheshire. Notable people with the surname include:

 Alfred Stephen Kenyon (1867–1943), Australian civil engineer and polymath
 Arthur Kenyon (footballer) (1867–1895), English footballer
 Basil Kenyon (1918–1996), South African rugby union player
 Carol Kenyon (born 1959), British singer
 Cecelia Kenyon (1923–1990), American political scientist
 Cynthia Kenyon (born 1954), American molecular biologist
 Dean H. Kenyon (born c. 1939), American biologist and proponent of intelligent design 
 Don Kenyon (1924–1996), English cricketer
 Doris Kenyon (1897–1979), American actress and singer
 Dorothy Kenyon (1888–1972), American lawyer
 E. W. Kenyon (1867–1948), American evangelist and president of a Bible Institute
 Elmer A. Kenyon (1870–1922), American politician
 Frederick C. Kenyon (1867–1941), American zoologist and anatomist
 Frederic G. Kenyon (1863–1952) British paleographer and biblical scholar
 James Kenyon (cinematographer) (1850–1925), English pioneer of cinematography
 James Kenyon (politician) (1846–1924), British Member of Parliament
 James Kenyon (sport shooter) (1875–1935), Canadian Olympic sport shooter
 Jane Kenyon (1947–1995), American poet and translator
 John Kenyon (priest) (1812–1869), Irish Catholic priest and Young Irelander
 John Robert Kenyon (1807–1880), British legal academic
 John Samuel Kenyon (1874–1959), American phonetician
 Kathleen Kenyon (1906–1978), British archaeologist of Neolithic culture
 Kyle Kenyon (1924–1996), American politician
 Lloyd Kenyon, 1st Baron Kenyon (1732–1802), British politician and barrister
 Lloyd Kenyon, 3rd Baron Kenyon (1805–1869), British Member of Parliament
 Mel Kenyon (born 1933), American racing driver
 Nicholas Kenyon (born 1951), English music administrator
 Peter Kenyon (born 1954), British chief executive of Chelsea Football Club
 Sandy Kenyon (1922–2010), American actor
 Sherrilyn Kenyon (born 1965), American writer of pulp fiction novels
 Steve Kenyon (born 1951), English long-distance runner
 Tom Kenyon (born 1972), Australian politician
 William C. Kenyon (1898–1951), American athlete and coach
 William S. Kenyon (Iowa politician) (1869–1933), American senator
 William S. Kenyon (New York politician) (1820–1896), U.S. representative from New York

References

See also
 Herbert Hollick-Kenyon (1897–1975), British aircraft pilot in Antarctica
 William Kenyon-Slaney (1847–1908), English sportsman, soldier and political

English-language surnames
Surnames of English origin